ART IST KUKU NU UT (before 2010, it bore the name Tartu Art Month(s)) is an international contemporary art festival which takes place every year in Tartu, Estonia. The festival is organized by Rael Artel and Kaisa Eiche.

The first festival took place in 2004.

References

Art festivals in Europe
Arts in Estonia
Tartu
Festivals in Estonia